Downtown Girls is an MTV reality show about five girls living in New York City. The series debuted on June 1, 2010.

Synopsis
Five girls discover and discuss love and life in the city that never sleeps.  They document their struggles, successes, and failures in their professional lives, as well as their dating lives.  While their luck is almost always uncertain, the one thing that is certain is their devotion to each other.

Episodes

References

External links
Official website

MTV original programming
Fashion-themed television series
2010s American reality television series
2010 American television series debuts
2010 American television series endings
Women in New York City